Assumpta Nnaggenda-Musana (née Assumpta Nnaggenda), also Assumpta Nnaggenda Musana, is a Ugandan architect, urban planner and academic, who serves as a lecturer in the Department of Architecture and Physical Planning, in the College of Engineering, Design, Art and Technology, at Makerere University, the oldest and largest public university in Uganda. She was the first woman in Uganda to obtain a doctorate degree in architecture, and as of February 2019, the only one.

Background and education
She was born to Mrs Grace Nnaggenda, a fashion designer and Professor Francis Nnaggenda, the well-known sculptor and painter. Both parents resided at Mengo, in Kampala, Uganda's capital city.

She attended Nakasero Primary School for her elementary schooling. For her O-Level studies, she went to Trinity College Nabbingo, in Wakiso District. She completed her A-Level education at Makerere High School, where she obtained her High School Diploma, in 1988.

She credits her parents, especially her father, with encouraging her to channel her artistic talents into architecture. In the 1980s there were no architecture courses at Ugandan universities. Her father suggested that she applied for a scholarship. In 1989, she secured a scholarship to study in the former Soviet Union, and was admitted to the Kharkov State University of Civil Engineering and Architecture, in present-day Ukraine. In 1994, she graduated with a Bachelor of Science degree in Architecture. The following year, the same university awarded her a Master of Science degree in the same subject.

Later, she was admitted to the KTH Royal Institute of Technology, in Stockholm, Sweden, on scholarship from the Swedish International Development Cooperation Agency. There she graduated with a Licentiate Degree in Urban Planning, in 2004. Four years later, she was awarded a Doctor of Philosophy degree in Urban Planning and the Environment, the first Ugandan woman to attain that academic achievement. Her studies at the Swedish Royal Institute of Technology, involved periods of research in the "informal settlements" of Uganda and Kenya. She specializes in sustainable urban settlements and low-income housing schemes in developing countries.

Career
In 1995, following her master's degree, she returned to Uganda and was hired by Land Plan Group, an architectural firm, as an architectural intern. She also worked as a part-time lecturer in the Department of Architecture at Makerere University. In 2002, the university hired her on a full-time basis as an assistant lecturer.

Upon graduation with her doctorate degree, she was promoted to full lecturer, in 2008. She has spoken out on the subject of affordable housing for the poor and urged the Ugandan government and Kampala City Council (the predecessor to Kampala Capital City Authority), which she accused of corruption and incompetence, to do better in order to avoid sprawling slums.

Her research suggests that low-rise housing would be a better solution than single-storey detached dwellings for the very poor. It makes better use of land, is more likely to allow people to live within reach of jobs, and ultimately requires less expenditure on infrastructure. Her proposals could be part of an "enabling strategy" for low-cost housing using local people's ideas and craft skills, according to Professor Emeritus Dick Urban Vestbro of KTH. She has also been chief designer in a university team developing mobile public toilets for city centres, slum communities and other places with poor sanitation.

Family
Assumpta Nnaggenda-Musana is married to Daniel Musana, a fellow architect in private practice, and together, are the parents of one son, Joshua Musana.

Other considerations
In addition to her academic responsibilities, Dr Assumpta Nnaggenda-Musana is an advisor to the National Planning Authority and has been involved in the National Development Plan.

References

External links
Uganda’s First Female PhD in Architecture
Nnagenda-Musana's Papers and Presentations
Website of the Department of Architecture and Physical Planning, in the College of Engineering, Design, Art and Technology, at Makerere University

Living people
1970 births
Ugandan women academics
Academic staff of Makerere University
Ugandan architects
Women architects
20th-century Ugandan women
21st-century Ugandan women
KTH Royal Institute of Technology alumni
People educated at Trinity College Nabbingo